The ambassador from New Zealand to Ireland is New Zealand's foremost diplomatic representative in Ireland, and in charge of New Zealand's diplomatic mission in that country.

The embassy is located in Dublin, Ireland's capital city. New Zealand has maintained a resident ambassador in Ireland since 2018. Previously, the New Zealand high commissioner to the United Kingdom was also accredited as ambassador to Ireland.

List of heads of mission

References

Ireland
 
New Zealand